Ladbrokes Coral is a British gambling company founded in 1886. Its product offering includes sports betting, online casino, online poker, and online bingo. The Ladbrokes portion of the group was established in 1886, and Coral in 1926. In November 2016, the companies merged to create Ladbrokes Coral Group. Since March 2018, it has been owned by Entain (formerly GVC Holdings). Prior to its sale, Ladbrokes Coral was listed on the London Stock Exchange, and was a member of the FTSE 250 Index.

History
The company was founded by Messrs. Schwind and Pennington in 1886, as commission agents for horses trained at Ladbroke Hall in Warwickshire. The name Ladbrokes was adopted in 1902, when Arthur Bendir joined the partnership, and operations were moved to London.

Ladbrokes' London offices were first in the vicinity of the Strand, moved to Hanover Square in 1906 and, in 1913, to Six Old Burlington Street, Mayfair. From 1913 to 1956, Ladbrokes' clientele was exclusively drawn from the British aristocracy and upper classes, many of whom were members of the elite gentlemen's clubs in the St James's area of Central London.

Unusually for the times, Ladbrokes' principal longtime representative on British racecourses was a woman, Helen Vernet. Having joined the firm in 1919, she was made a partner in 1928 and remained with the firm until shortly before her death in 1956, at the age of 80.

Following the end of World War II, Ladbrokes' fortunes were in steady decline, thanks to an austere postwar economic climate, a dwindling client base, and reluctance to change the firm's specialised approach to bookmaking. As a result, in 1956 the company was acquired by Mark Stein and his nephew Cyril Stein for a reported £100,000.

In 1961, the government legalised betting shops under the Betting and Gaming Act. As managing director, Stein used profits from the business's traditional areas to establish a chain of betting shops. The company first diversified outside the betting business by taking a major stake in the Dragonara Palace in Malta, a casino and hotel, which opened its first phase in 1964.

In 1967, Ladbrokes was floated on the London Stock Exchange. From 1967 to 1973, Ladbrokes' retail betting business grew from less than 50 shops to 1,135, and the company expanded its ventures to include bingo clubs, hotels under the Dragonara brand, casinos in London, holiday centres, and real estate investments. In 1973, Terry Rogers received £250,000 and 100,000 Ladbrokes shares when he sold his stake in a 53-shop chain of English betting shops to Ladbrokes.

In 1975, Ladbrokes moved into racecourse management by purchasing Lingfield Park. This was followed by the acquisitions in 1976 of Perry Barr Stadium and Totalisators and Greyhound Holdings, which owned six greyhound racing stadia at Brough Park, Crayford & Bexleyheath, Leeds, Gosforth, Willenhall and Monmore. Arthur Aldridge, formerly of the Greyhound Racing Association, joined Ladbrokes as Racing Director.

The company was rocked by scandal in 1979 with the exposure of illegal marketing schemes at its London casinos, including the bribery of a police officer to obtain information about high rollers at competing casinos. As a result, Ladbrokes was forced to close its four casinos in London, which accounted for roughly 40% of the company's profits.

Ladbrokes acquired Texas Homecare, a chain of DIY stores, in 1986. In October 1987, it acquired Hilton International from Allegis Corporation for £645 million, gaining 91 hotels and the rights to the Hilton brand outside the United States. Ladbrokes acquired Vernons Football Pools in 1989.

Stein retired in January 1994, under pressure from investors because of the company's rising debts and losses. Under new management, Ladbrokes focused on its core areas of hotels and gambling, and began to divest other parts of its business. Texas Homecare was sold to Sainsbury's in January 1995 for £290 million.

Ladbrokes' extensive portfolio of commercial and residential real estate, valued at £1 billion in 1993, was sold off in pieces and by March 1997 was down to £70 million. As part of its redoubled focus on gambling, Ladbrokes returned to casinos in September 1994, with a £50 million purchase of three clubs in London, which it stated was the first step in building an international casino business.

In September 1998, Ladbrokes purchased Coral, a chain of betting shops with 891 locations, from Bass plc for £363 million. The UK Government, however, ordered Ladbrokes to sell Coral after the Monopolies and Mergers Commission found that the acquisition was anti-competitive.

The Coral business, except for 59 shops in Ireland and Jersey, was sold in a management buyout financed by Morgan Grenfell Private Equity for £390 million in February 1999. In March 1999, the company acquired Stakis Hotels for £1.3 billion, gaining 53 hotels and 22 casinos. Later that year, Ladbrokes renamed itself as Hilton Group plc, to reflect its increasing focus on the hotel business, which had come to represent over 80 percent of the company's assets.

In August 1999, Hilton Group decided to dispose of its gambling operations outside of Europe due to disappointing results. Most of the assets, including racetracks and casinos in the United States and bingo and betting businesses in South America, were sold by 2001. In addition, the company sold its twenty-seven casinos in the United Kingdom to the Gala Group in December 2000 for £236 million.

In February 2006, the company sold its hotel operations to Hilton Hotels Corporation for £3.5 billion, and once more rebranded itself as Ladbrokes plc. In March 2007, the Vernons brand was sold to Sportech.

Following the introduction of the Gambling Act 2005 in the United Kingdom and the subsequent relaxation of advertising laws for gambling companies in 2007, a television campaign by Ladbrokes that included a host of ex professional footballers was the first to result in complaints to the Advertising Standards Authority (ASA); the ASA eventually cleared the campaign. The company once again came under fire from the ASA in January 2009, due to complaints relating to an advertising campaign. 

Since 2007, Ladbrokes operated in Spain through the LBApuestas brand, but in April 2014 it terminated its licence for LBApuestas and created a website, Sportium, in a joint venture with the Spanish gaming and leisure operator Cirsa. The company entered the online betting market in Australia with its acquisition of Bookmaker.com.au for £13 million in September 2013, followed by a purchase of Betstar for £12 million in April 2014.

In June 2015, Ladbrokes announced that they were in talks with the board of Gala Coral Group over a possible merger. The combination of the two companies created Britain's biggest bookmaker, with over 4,000 betting shops and 30,000 employees.

In July 2016, the Competition and Markets Authority identified 642 areas where the merger would harm local competition, and said 350 to 400 shops would need to be sold off for the merger to be approved. The merger was completed on 2 November 2016. To effect the merger, Ladbrokes acquired the Coral Group and then changed its name from Ladbrokes plc to Ladbrokes Coral Group plc.

In December 2017, GVC Holdings agreed to buy Ladbrokes Coral in a deal that could be worth up to £4 billion.

In January 2018, Ladbrokes Coral and the Scottish Professional Football League agreed to extend the betting company's sponsorship agreement until at 2020. The deal saw the bookmaker remain the principal sponsor of the top four divisions of Scottish football in a deal worth up to £5 million.

In March 2018, Ladbrokes completed their omnichannel integration strategy with software provider Playtech, offering single account functionality for all its online, mobile and retail products in the United Kingdom. Also in March 2018, GVC Holdings completed its acquisition with GVC shareholders owning 53.5% and Ladbrokes Coral 46.5% of the combined company.

Regulatory Sanctions and Fines
In December 2018, Ladbrokes paid victims £1 million in compensation after it was disclosed that a problem gambler had been stealing funds from his business clients to fund his habit. The payments were made on the condition that the victims did not report the operator to the UK Gambling Commission, the regulatory body in charge of monitoring all gambling in the United Kingdom.

On 31 July 2019, the UK Gambling Commission announced that Ladbrokes Coral would pay £5.9m for past failings in anti-money laundering and social responsibility. An investigation found that the companies failed to put in place effective safeguards, to prevent consumers suffering gambling harm and against money laundering, between November 2014 and October 2017.

On 14 February 2020, the Liquor and Gaming New South Wales regulatory agency imposed a fine of AUD207,500 on Ladbrokes Australia and another GVC Holdings brand, Neds, for offering illegal gambling inducements to residents in New South Wales. The regulator called it "the biggest ever fine of its kind" in NSW.

Notes

Entain
Bookmakers
Online gambling companies of the United Kingdom
Online poker companies
Gambling companies of the United Kingdom
Gambling companies of the Channel Islands
Hotel and leisure companies based in London
Gambling companies established in 1886
1886 establishments in England
Companies formerly listed on the London Stock Exchange
1956 mergers and acquisitions
2018 mergers and acquisitions
Companies based in London
Companies established in 1886
Companies of the United Kingdom